Rekall may refer to:

 Rekall (software), a database front-end
 Rekall (musician) (Kris Gale), an electronic musician
 Fictional company in the Philip K. Dick story "We Can Remember It for You Wholesale"
 Rekall Incorporated, a company in Total Recall, its remake, and Total Recall 2070

See also 
 Recall (disambiguation)